is a Japanese author, translator, and scholar of French literature.

Biography
Horie was born in Gifu Prefecture, and studied at Waseda University, where he is now a professor of creative writing. He studied for three years at the University of Paris III on a French government scholarship.  Horie, who is also a member of many literary prize selection committees, is a critic and translator of authors including Michel Foucault, Hervé Guibert, Michel Rio, and Jacques Réda.  His books have been translated into French, Korean, and English.

Books (selection)
Kōgai e (郊外へ, "To the Suburbs"), 1995
 Shigosen wo motomete (子午線を求めて, "In Search of the Meridian"), 2000
 Kakareru te (書かれる手, "The Hand Which is Written"), 2000
Kuma no shikiishi (熊の敷石, "The Bear and the Paving Stone"), 2000

Prizes
 1999 Mishima Yukio Prize for Oparavan (おぱらばん)
 2001 Akutagawa Prize for Kuma no shikiishi (The Bear And The Paving Stone, 熊の敷石)
 2004 Tanizaki Prize for Yukinuma to sono shūhen (Yukinuma and Its Environs, 雪沼とその周辺)
 2005 Yomiuri Prize for Kagan bōjitsushō
 2010 Yomiuri Prize, Section for Essay & Travelogue, for Seigen Kyokusen (正弦曲線, "Sine Curve")
 2012 Sei Itō Literary Prize for Nazuna (なずな)
 2013 Mainichi Book Review Prize for Furiko de kotoba wo saguru yō ni (振り子で言葉を探るように, "Like Fumbling for Words with a Pendulum")

References

External links
 Toshiyuki Horie at J'Lit Books from Japan 
 Synopsis of In and Around Yukinuma (Yukinuma to sono shuhen) at JLPP (Japanese Literature Publishing Project) 
 Interview 
 Interview 
Toshiyuki Horie at Pushkin Press (in English)

Japanese writers
Akutagawa Prize winners
Yukio Mishima Prize winners
Yomiuri Prize winners
Living people
Year of birth missing (living people)